Barm-e Gavmishi-ye Seh (also Romanized as Barm-e Gāvmīshī-ye Seh; also known as Barm-e Gāvmīsh-e Bālā, Barm-e Gāvmīshī ‘Olyā, Barm-e Gāvmīshī-ye Bālā, and Barmgavmish) is a village in Howmeh Rural District, in the Central District of Haftgel County, Khuzestan Province, Iran. At the 2006 census, its population was 1,126, in 226 families.

References 

Populated places in Haftkel County